The 2017 Texas Roadhouse 200 presented by Alpha Energy Solutions was the 20th stock car race of the 2017 NASCAR Camping World Truck Series, the fourth race of the 2017 NASCAR Camping World Truck Series playoffs, the first race of the Round of 6, and the 19th iteration of the event. The race was held on Saturday, October 28, 2017, in Martinsville, Virginia at Martinsville Speedway, a  permanent oval-shaped short track. The race took the 200 laps to complete. On the final restart with 10 to go, Kyle Busch Motorsports driver Noah Gragson was able to pull away from the field to win his first career NASCAR Camping World Truck Series win and his only win of the season. To fill out the podium, Matt Crafton of ThorSport Racing and Johnny Sauter of GMS Racing would finish second and third, respectively.

Background 
Martinsville Speedway is an NASCAR-owned stock car racing track located in Henry County, in Ridgeway, Virginia, just to the south of Martinsville. At 0.526 miles (0.847 km) in length, it is the shortest track in the NASCAR Cup Series. The track was also one of the first paved oval tracks in NASCAR, being built in 1947 by H. Clay Earles. It is also the only remaining race track that has been on the NASCAR circuit from its beginning in 1948.

Entry list 

 (R) denotes rookie driver.
 (i) denotes driver who is ineligible for series driver points.

Practice

First practice 
The first practice session was held on Friday, October 27, at 1:00 PM EST. The session would last for 55 minutes.

Second and final practice 
The final practice session, sometimes known as Happy Hour, was held on Friday, October 27, at 3:00 PM EST. The session would last for 55 minutes.

Qualifying 
Qualifying was held on Saturday, October 28, at 10:00 AM EST. The first round was 15 minutes, where every driver would be able to set a lap within the 15 minutes. Then, the second round would consist of the fastest 24 cars in Round 1, and drivers would have 10 minutes to set a lap. Round 3 consisted of the fastest 12 drivers from Round 2, and the drivers would have 5 minutes to set a time. Whoever was fastest in Round 3 would win the pole.

Mike Senica was the only driver to fail to qualify.

Full qualifying results

Race results 
Stage 1 Laps: 50

Stage 2 Laps: 50

Stage 3 Laps: 100

Standings after the race 

Drivers' Championship standings

Note: Only the first 8 positions are included for the driver standings.

References 

2017 NASCAR Camping World Truck Series
NASCAR races at Texas Motor Speedway
October 2017 sports events in the United States
2017 in sports in Texas